George Waters may refer to:

 George Waters (businessman) (1916–2003), pioneer in the credit card industry
 George Waters (MP) (1827–1905), Member of Parliament for Mallow, Ireland
 George Alexander Waters (1820–1903), British Navy officer
 George Roger Waters (born 1943), full name of English musician Roger Waters

See also
 George Walters (disambiguation)
 George Watters (soldier) (1904–1980), Scottish miner and labourer who fought in the Spanish Civil War
 George Watters II (born 1949), American motion picture sound editor